Buyelwa Patience Sonjica (born 23 March 1950) is a South African politician who served as Minister of Water and Environmental Affairs from May 2009 until November 2010.

Early life
Sonjica received degrees from Vista University and Rhodes University. She worked as a student nurse and a teacher.

Politics
In 1976–77 she was involved in student politics in East London. She was active against the Apartheid regime in the UDF and SADTU when the African National Congress was illegal in South Africa. After the readmission of the ANC, she became active for it in Port Elizabeth.

Since the 1994 general election, Sonjica was a member of South Africa's Parliament. She was Deputy minister in the Department for Arts and Culture. In 2004, she was appointed as Minister in the Department of Water Affairs and Forestry, in 2006 as Minister for Minerals and Energy, and in 2009 as Minister of Water and Environmental Affairs.

References

External links
Who's who profile

1950 births
Living people
Xhosa people
African National Congress politicians
Government ministers of South Africa
Members of the National Assembly of South Africa
Women government ministers of South Africa
21st-century South African women politicians
21st-century South African politicians
20th-century South African women politicians
20th-century South African politicians
Women members of the National Assembly of South Africa